Golshanabad (also Romanized as Golshanābād; also known as Shādābeh) is a village in Dughayi Rural District, in the Central District of Quchan County, Razavi Khorasan Province, Iran. At the 2006 census, its population was 89, in 28 families.

References 

Populated places in Quchan County